Swarthmore is a borough in Delaware County, Pennsylvania. Swarthmore was originally named "Westdale" in honor of noted painter Benjamin West, who was one of the early residents of the town. The name was changed to "Swarthmore" after the establishment of Swarthmore College. The borough population was 6,194 as of the 2010 census.

History

The borough was originally part of Springfield Township, and grew up around Swarthmore College, which was founded in 1864. The advent of passenger rail service from Philadelphia in the 1880s greatly enhanced the desirability of the borough as a commuter suburb, and the borough was incorporated in 1893.

About one third of the borough's land area consists of the Swarthmore College campus. Many of the streets in the southern half of town are named for eastern colleges, and much of the borough's housing stock dates from the Victorian period through the 1920s.
The Ogden House and Benjamin West Birthplace are listed on the National Register of Historic Places.

Geography
Swarthmore is located in east-central Delaware County at  (39.901788, −75.347083). It is bordered to the north, east, and southwest by Springfield Township, to the southeast by Ridley Township, and to the west by Nether Providence Township. Crum Creek, a south-flowing tributary of the Delaware River, forms the western boundary of the borough.

It has a humid subtropical climate (Cfa) and average monthly temperatures range from 33.1 °F in January to 78.0 °F in July. The local hardiness zone is 7a.

Government
Swarthmore is represented in the Pennsylvania General Assembly as the PA 161st Legislative District and the PA 26th Senate District.  The former position is held by Rep. Leanne Krueger-Braneky and the latter by former Swarthmore mayor Sen. Tim Kearney, both Democrats.

Demographics

As of the 2010 census, there were 6,194 people, 1,963 households, and 1,327 families residing in the borough. The racial makeup of the borough was 82.5% White, 7.7% Asian, 5.0% African American, 0.3% Native American, 0.1% Pacific Islander, .7% from other races, and 3.8% from two or more races. Hispanic or Latino of any race were 4.9% of the population.

There were 1,963 households, out of which 34.1% had children under the age of 18 living with them, 57.3% were married couples living together, 7.8% had a female householder with no husband present, 2.4% had a male householder with no wife present, and 32.4% were non-families. 27.6% of all households were made up of individuals, and 12.5% had someone living alone who was 65 years of age or older. The average household size was 2.48 and the average family size was 3.06.

In the borough, the population was spread out, with 20.7% under the age of 18, 15.8% from 20 to 24, 15.3% from 25 to 44, 25.4% from 45 to 64, and 12.4% who were 65 years of age or older. The median age was 30.8 years. For every 100 females, there were 89.7 males. For every 100 females age 18 and over, there were 86.9 males.

As of 2015, median income for a household in the borough was $101,686, and the median income for a family was $144,570. Males had a median income of $71,750 versus $51,117 for females. The per capita income for the borough was $40,482.  About 0.0% of families and 2.3% of the population were below the poverty line.

Education
Swarthmore lies within the Wallingford-Swarthmore School District. In 1983, the district was formed via a merger with the Nether Providence School District and Swarthmore-Rutledge School District. Public school students attend Swarthmore-Rutledge Elementary School, housed in the old Swarthmore High School, for grades K-5, Strath Haven Middle School for grades 6–8, and Strath Haven High School for grades 9-12.

The borough's only private school is the George Crothers Memorial School, housed in the old Rutgers Avenue School. Notre Dame de Lourdes Catholic School is located adjacent to the borough.

For higher education, the borough is home to Swarthmore College, an academically-acclaimed private liberal arts college.

Transportation

Pennsylvania Route 320 is the only numbered highway serving Swarthmore. It follows a north-south alignment through the center of the borough via Chester Road, Swarthmore Avenue and Cedar Lane.

Swarthmore Station, a SEPTA Regional Rail train station on the Media/Wawa Line, sits between the college and the town's center. SEPTA Route 109 bus connecting Chester with Upper Darby stops along Chester Road.

Cultural institutions

Scott Arboretum is located on the campus of Swarthmore College.

The Swarthmore Public Library is at 121 Park Avenue in the center of the borough.

The Park Avenue Community Center is adjacent to Swarthmore Borough Hall and hosts a range of cultural activities, theater and music.

Notable people
Charles Andes (1930–2006), former businessman
Valerie Hollister (born 1939), artist and painter
John Honnold (1915–2011), former law professor, University of Pennsylvania Law School
Edmund Jones, Swarthmore Mayor from 1966–1971 and Pennsylvania State Representative 1971–1974
Mary Gay Scanlon (born 1959), United States Representative
Rogers Stevens (born 1979), guitarist of band Blind Melon
Benjamin West (1738–1820), former artist and painter

References

External links

 Borough of Swarthmore official website
 Swarthmore Public Library

 
Populated places established in 1893
Boroughs in Delaware County, Pennsylvania
1893 establishments in Pennsylvania